Darril Wayne Fosty (December 21, 1968) is a Canadian-born Pulitzer-nominated journalist, author, and documentarian.

History 

Born in Terrace, British Columbia on December 21, 1968, Fosty's family moved to Kamloops, British Columbia, where he started grade one. After high school, Fosty moved to Bellingham, Washington, where he attended Western Washington University majoring in history and journalism and graduating in 1992. 

In 1994, Fosty wrote press releases for the Seattle Sounders FC sports information department. After leaving the Sounders, he worked for the Internet security start-up Zendit, now Authora. In 2003, Fosty released his first book with his brother George, Splendid is the Sun: The 5,000 Year History of Hockey.

In 2004, he released the book Black Ice: The Lost History of the Colored Hockey League, 1895-1925 which was featured in a short documentary on ESPN and featured on Oprah.com "Books That Made A Difference". The book is credited with the revival of the history of the Colored Hockey League of the Maritimes. 

A documentary short written, produced, and directed by Fosty in conjunction with the National Hockey League Diversity Program called Black Ice was the winner of Best Documentary Short at the 2008 Roxbury Film Festival in Boston. 

Darril and his brother George were honored by the Shaka Franklin Foundation of Denver, Colorado, for the creation of "The Black Ice Project" and their ongoing efforts to preserve Black history (2008), teaching awards from George Washington University for the book Black Ice (2011)  and John G. Dennison Award in 2020 by the Black History Ottawa board for the promotion of Canadian Black history and culture.

In 2013, the Fosty brothers' book Where Brave Men Fall: The Battle of Dieppe and the Espionage War Against Hitler, 1939-1942 pointed a damning finger at American and British news organizations, including Time and Life, accusing the publications of leaking the Battle of Dieppe pre-raid information to the Germans resulting in the deaths, woundings, and capture of over 4,300 American, British and Canadian soldiers. 

In July 2021, it was announced that LeBron James, Drake and Maverick Carter are producing Hubert Davis's documentary film Black Ice, based on the Fosty brothers' historical research discussing Black hockey history, racial justice, and diversity.

In 2022, Fosty released the book Nais-Myth: Basketball's Stolen Legacy which credits the invention of basketball to a 16-year-old volunteer director at the Herkimer, New York, Y.M.C.A. named Lambert Will who invented the game of basketball in 1891 only to have his idea taken and credited to James Naismith.

Personal life

Fosty is currently living in New York City and is the co-founder of the Society of North American Sports Historians and Researchers and founder and editor-in-chief of Boxscore World Sportswire.

Non-fiction 
Splendid Is The Sun: The 5,000 Year History of Hockey (2003).
Black Ice: The Lost History of the Colored Hockey League of the Maritimes (2004).
Footie's Black Book: A Guide To International Association Football (World Cup Soccer 2010 Edition) (2010).
Where Brave Men Fall: The Battle of Dieppe And The Allied Espionage War Against Hitler, 1939–1942 (2013).
Tribes: An International Hockey History (2014).
Creating Excellence: Inside the World of Stryker-Indigo (2014).
Nais-Myth: Basketball's Stolen Legacy (2022).

Fiction 
Apocalypse 2012 Cookbook: An End of the World Cooking and Survival Guide for the Man, Woman and Family On the Run (2011).

References

1968 births
Canadian expatriate writers in the United States
Canadian expatriates in the United States
Canadian sportswriters
Journalists from British Columbia
Living people
People from Terrace, British Columbia
Writers from British Columbia